Kupreliškis is a town in Biržai district municipality, in Panevėžys County, northern Lithuania. According to the 2011 census, the town has a population of 188 people.

References

Biržai District Municipality
Towns in Panevėžys County
Towns in Lithuania